The 1931–32 Boston Bruins season was the Bruins' eighth season in the NHL. The team finished fourth in the division, out of the playoffs.

Offseason

Regular season

In the course of playing a 0–0 tie against the New York Americans on January 3, 1932, the Bruins shot the puck the length of the ice 87 times to relieve pressure on their goal. To stop this becoming a regular tactic, the icing rule was introduced into the NHL later in the decade.

Final standings

Record vs. opponents

Schedule and results

Playoffs
The Bruins did not qualify for the postseason.

Player statistics

Regular season
Scoring

Goaltending

Awards and records

Transactions

See also
1931–32 NHL season

References

External links

Boston Bruins seasons
Boston
Boston
Boston Bruins
Boston Bruins
1930s in Boston